Syvdefjorden is a fjord in Vanylven Municipality in Møre og Romsdal county, Norway. The old Syvde municipality was centered on this fjord until it was merged into Vanylven municipality in 1964.

See also
 List of Norwegian fjords

References

Fjords of Møre og Romsdal
Vanylven